Loveleen Tandan is an Indian film and casting director. She is the co-director (India) of Slumdog Millionaire along with Danny Boyle. She has also been the casting director for several other films, including Monsoon Wedding (2001) and Brick Lane (2007). She has been a casting consultant for The Namesake (2007). 

Loveleen has featured in the "Annual Women's Big Impact Report", an initiative of Hollywood's Variety magazine, which profiles women that have made pathbreaking contributions in world entertainment.

Early life and background 

Loveleen Tandan was born and raised in New Delhi, India. She did her schooling from Mater Dei School. Loveleen studied Sociology Honors at the Hindu College, University of Delhi. She was active in college politics and was nominated as the Finance Minister of the college. She pursued a Master's degree with top honors in Mass Communication from MCRC, Jamia Millia Islamia University.

Career 
Loveleen Tandan has worked with Deepa Mehta on Earth (1998), and later worked with Mira Nair on three films: Monsoon Wedding  (2001), Vanity Fair (2004) and The Namesake (2006). She was also the casting director (alongside Shaheen Baig) for Brick Lane (2007), directed by Sarah Gavron and adapted from Monica Ali's novel of the same name.

Tandan's most major credit is Slumdog Millionaire (2008), where she initially began as one of the film's casting directors (with Gail Stevens co-ordinating casting from London) but was, during production on the film, designated as the "Co-Director: India" by Danny Boyle in recognition of her significant contributions in the making of the film. Boyle explained his reasoning behind the credit by stating it was "because I had her there every day, and I kind of relied on her enormously to make sure I didn't make any big mistakes, and obviously, translation for the kids. And translation of the text because obviously, if you translate a line of Simon's literally into Hindi, a seven-year-old is just going to go… So, they had to be given a line that was the equivalent in Hindi." Tandan herself has stated that she was given the co-director credit after she "suggested to Danny and Simon Beaufoy, the writer of Slumdog, that it was important to do some of it in Hindi to bring the film alive (20% of the film is in Hindi). They asked me to come up with Hindi dialogues which I, of course, instantly agreed to do. And as we drew closer to the shoot date, Danny asked me to step in as the co-director."

The film won eight Academy Awards, five Critics' Choice Awards, four Golden Globes and seven BAFTA Awards. Tandan's work as co-director of the film was recognised by the New York Film Critics Online Awards (NYFCCO Awards), which awarded "Best Director" to "Danny Boyle with Loveleen Tandan".

Filmography

Director 
 Slumdog Millionaire (2008) – Co-Director (India)

Casting director 
   Slumdog Millionaire (2008)
  Tandoori Love (2008)
 Brick Lane  (2007)
 Migration  (2007)
  Vanity Fair  (2004)
  Monsoon Wedding  (2001)

Casting consultant 
 The Namesake (2006)

A.D. department 
 Earth (Indian title: 1947) (1998) – production assistant

Further reading 
 CNN staff. "'Slumdog' defied the odds." CNN, 12 January 2009.
 Ganguly, Prithwish. "Salaam slum children of Mumbai: Loveleen." Daily News & Analysis, 13 January 2009.
 IANS. "Slumdog Millionaire' has an Indian co-director." The Hindu, 11 January 2009.
 Setoodeh, Ramin. "The Oscar Doesn’t Go To.... Newsweek, 10 January 2009.
 Huttner, Jan Lisa Giving Credit Where Credit is Due! 12/11/08 Blog Post
 PRWeb Huttner Wins Silver Feather Award
 Arora, Chandna, 'Delhi girl in the Mumbai story", The Times of India, TNN, 10 January 2009
 Sengupta, Somini, "Extreme Mumbai, Without Bollywood’s Filtered Lens", The New York Times, 11 November 2008

References 

"Hindu to Jamia...-and now Oscars". Indian Express.
"Surprise Star". Tehelka.
"Hindu was an adventure: Lovleen". The Times of India. 1 July 2009.

External links 
 
 Slumdog Millionaire (archived 2009)

Film directors from Delhi
Hindi-language film directors
Indian women film directors
Year of birth missing (living people)
Living people
Hindu College, Delhi alumni
Jamia Millia Islamia alumni
Punjabi people
21st-century Indian film directors
Women artists from Delhi
Indian casting directors
Women casting directors